These are the results of the Men's C-2 10000 metres competition in canoeing at the 1952 Summer Olympics.  The C-2 event is raced by two-man sprint canoes. Heats and final took place on July 27.

Medalists

Final
With only nine teams competing, a final was held.

References
1952 Summer Olympics official report. p. 634.
Sports reference.com 1952 C-2 10000 m results.

Men's C-2 10000
Men's events at the 1952 Summer Olympics